Miss Kumari (1932–1969) was an Indian actress working in the Malayalam film industry between 1949 and 1969. In the 50's and early 60's she was the most prominent female lead in the Malayalam film industry. She briefly worked as a teacher before she made her film debut in the 1949 film Vellinakshatram. She took on the stage name Miss Kumari on the sets of her second film, Nalla Thanka.

Miss Kumari is noted for her performance in films such as Sasidharan (1950), Chechi (1950), Yachakan (1951), Navalokam (1951), Aathmasakhi (1952), Alphonsa (1952), Sheriyo Thetto (1953), Avakaasi (1954), Neelakuyil (1954),  C.I.D. (1955),  Padatha Paingili (1957), Randidangazhi (1958), Mudiyanaya Puthran (1961), Aana Valarthiya Vanampadi (1961) and Pattaabhishekam (1962). Miss Kumari has, in her career spanning 18 years done, 34 films.

Miss Kumari has won two Madras State Award for Best Actress for her performances in Aniyathi (1955) and Aana Valarthiya Vanampadi (1961). Her film Neelakuyil (1954) was the first Malayalam film to win the All India Certificate of Merit for Best Feature Film  and is now regarded as a landmark film in the history of Malayalam cinema, It was Miss Kumari's breakthrough and the most memorable film in her career. Another film, Padatha Paingili (1957) won the President’s Silver Medal, being the second Malayalam film to do so.

Early life
Miss Kumari, whose real name was Thresiamma, was born on 1 June 1932 to Thomas and Eliyamma, at Bharananganam in Kottayam, Travancore, British India, which is now part of the state of Kerala. She did her primary education at Bharanganam Sacred Hearts High School, an all girls high school run by The Franciscan Clarist Congregation Of Sisters. After her studies, she worked briefly as a teacher in the same school.

Career

1949 - 54 
Thresiamma debuted in Malayalam with the 1949 film Vellinakshatram, the first production of Udaya Studios and the 7th Malayalam feature film. Unfortunately, the film was a commercial failure. But, impressed with her screen presence in the film Udaya Studios launches her as the main lead in their next film, Nalla Thanka. It was in this film she took on the stage name Miss Kumari. Nalla Thanka was a huge success at the box office, establishing herself as a leading actress in the industry. After the success of Nalla Thanka, she starred in a series of films like Sasidharan (1950), Chechi (1950), Yachakan (1951), Navalokam (1951), Aathmasakhi (1952), Alphonsa (1952), Aatmashaanthi (1952), Sheriyo Thetto (1953) and Avakaasi (1954). However, her fame reached a fever pitch in 1954 with the release of Neelakuyil, where she starred alongside Sathyan. Neelakuyil was a huge success at the box office and wins the President’s Silver Medal and marks the first time this honor had been bestowed on a South Indian film. It is now regarded a landmark film in Malayalam film history.

Personal life
In 1963, Miss Kumari married Hormis Thaliath, an engineer at F.A.C.T Kochi. She immediately retired from the industry to focus on family life. The couple has three children: Johnny, Thomas, and Babu. Johnny is in the finance business, Thomas is a Computer Engineer in California and Babu is a Professor in the Centre of German Studies at Jawaharlal Nehru University (JNU), New Delhi. She died from complications of stomach ailments on 9 June 1969 at the age of 37. The burial took place in Bharananganam, her native place. Miss Kumari Memorial Stadium was built in Bharananganam, which was inaugurated by veteran actor Prem Nazir.

Filmography

References

External links
 
 https://misskumari.com/

1932 births
1969 deaths
Indian film actresses
Actresses from Kottayam
Actresses in Malayalam cinema
20th-century Indian actresses